"Japanese Lovesong" is the second single from the Dutch group Ten Sharp, released in June 1985. The song was written by the band and produced by Michiel Hoogenboezem. The single made it into the Dutch Top 40, reaching number 30. The song combines a reggae-feel with Eastern vocal lines and synth-sounds. In the extended version of the song there is a long instrumental part with a heavy bass driven hook. Samples of the falsetto choir also appear.

The B-side "Goin' On" is a piano ballad with vocals and piano only.

Track listings
 7" single
 "Japanese Lovesong" - 4:42
 "Goin' On" - 3:40

 12" maxi
 "Japanese Lovesong" (Extended Dance-Mix) - 10:43
 "Goin' On" - 3:40

Credits
 Produced by Michiel Hoogenboezem
 Mixing engineer: Ronald Prent
 Design: MaCo Productions

Musicians
 Vocals: Marcel Kapteijn
 Keyboards and Piano: Niels Hermes
 Guitars: Martin Boers
 Bass: Ton Groen
 Drums: Wil Bouwes

References

External links
 The official Ten Sharp website

1985 singles
Ten Sharp songs
1985 songs
Epic Records singles